The qulliq (seal-oil, blubber or soapstone lamp, kudlik), is the traditional oil lamp used by Arctic peoples, including the Inuit, the Chukchi and the Yupik peoples.

This characteristic type of oil lamp provided warmth and light in the harsh Arctic environment where there was no wood and where the sparse inhabitants relied almost entirely on seal oil or on whale blubber. This lamp was the single most important article of furniture for the Inuit in their dwellings.

History

It is uncertain in which period the seal-oil lamps began to be used. They are part of a series of technological innovations among the Arctic peoples whose introduction and spread has been partly documented. Oil lamps have been found in sites of Paleo-Eskimo communities dating back to the time of the Norton tradition, 3,000 years ago. They were a common implement of the Dorset culture and of the Thule people, the lamps manufactured then showing little changes compared with more recent ones.

In the Inuit religion, one of the stories of the Sun and the Moon, the sun deity Sukh-eh-nukh—known as Malina in Greenland—carries an oil lamp which gets overturned spilling oil and soot on her hands and she blackens the face of her brother, the moon deity Ahn-ing-ah-neh (Anningan in Greenland and Igaluk elsewhere). Among the Netsilik if the people breached certain taboos, Nuliajuk, the Sea Woman, held the marine mammal in the basin of her lamp. When this happened the angakkuq had to visit her to beg for game. This story also inspired a New Year tradition in which three lamps were extinguished and relit during the first sunrise.

In former times, the lamp was a multi-purpose tool. The Arctic peoples used the lamp for illuminating and heating their tents, semi-subterranean houses and igloos, as well as for melting snow, cooking, and drying their clothes.

In present times such lamps are mainly used for ceremonial purposes. Owing to its cultural significance, a qulliq is featured on the coat of arms of Nunavut.

A qulliq was lit to commence the investiture ceremony of Mary Simon, the first Inuk, and indigenous person, to be appointed to the position of Governor General of Canada, in the Senate Chamber, 26 July 2021.

Description and use
The Inuit oil lamps were made mainly of soapstone, but there are also some made of a special kind of pottery. Sizes and shapes of lamps could be different, but most were either elliptical or half-moon shaped. The taqquti or wick trimmers, also known as lamp feeders, were made of wood, willow, soapstone, bone or ivory (see illustration).

The wick was mostly made of Arctic cottongrass (suputi), common cottongrass and/or dried moss (ijju/maniq ) It was lit along the edge of the lamp, providing a pleasant light. A slab of seal blubber could be left to melt over the lamp feeding it with more fat. These lamps had to be tended continually by trimming the wick in such a way that the lamp would not produce smoke.

Although such lamps were usually filled with seal blubber and the English term 'seal-oil lamp' is common in writings about Arctic peoples, they could also be filled with whale blubber in communities where there was whaling. However, the term 'whale-oil lamp' refers to a different kind of lighting device. 
Generally caribou fat was a poor choice, as was the fat of other land animals, seal oil being a more efficient fuel for the lamp. Women used to scrape the skin of a freshly skinned seal with an ulu in order not to waste any fat. Once the seal skin was stretched and dried (see gallery below) it would be scraped using a halukhit (see gallery below) to remove the dried fat.

Realizing that these lamps were such an important fixture of the Inuit household that "when the family moved the lamp went along with it", Arctic explorer William Edward Parry (1790–1855) commented:

Gallery

References

Further reading
 
  Hungarian translation of Rasmussen 1926.

External links

Qulliq (Oil Lamp) presented by Arnait Video Productions

Oil lamp
Inuit tools
Chukchi culture
Yupik culture
Siberian Yupik